The Pontchartrain Center is a 4,600-seat multi-purpose arena in Kenner, Louisiana, USA. The facility opened in 1991. It hosts concerts and local sporting events. 

Seating capacities:
Sporting events: 3,600
Concerts: 3,700
Graduations: 3,585
Conventions: 3,228

List of notable events
The Ultimate Fighting Championship's
UFC 16: Battle in the Bayou
UFC 18: Road to the Heavyweight Title

See also
List of convention centers in the United States
List of music venues

References

External links

Official website

Basketball venues in New Orleans
Boxing venues in New Orleans
Convention centers in Louisiana
Gymnastics venues in New Orleans
Indoor arenas in New Orleans
Mixed martial arts venues in Louisiana
Music venues in Louisiana
Tennis venues in New Orleans
Volleyball venues in New Orleans
Wrestling venues in New Orleans
Buildings and structures in Jefferson Parish, Louisiana
Event venues established in 1991
Sports venues completed in 1991
1991 establishments in Louisiana